Clay Township is an inactive township in Ralls County, in the U.S. state of Missouri.

Clay Township has the name of Kentucky statesman Henry Clay.

References

Townships in Missouri
Townships in Ralls County, Missouri